De Berk (The Birch Tree) may refer to

People
Lucia de Berk (born 1961), Dutch nurse wrongfully convicted of murder

Places

De Berk, North Brabant, Netherlands

Windmills

De Berk, Drenthe, Netherlands